Bolshaya Serva is a rural locality (a village) in Stepanovskoye Rural Settlement, Kudymkarsky District, Perm Krai, Russia. The population was 289 as of 2010. There are 13 streets.

Geography 
Bolshaya Serva is located 5 km northeast of Kudymkar (the district's administrative centre) by road. Zyulganova is the nearest rural locality.

References 

Rural localities in Kudymkarsky District